These are tables of congressional delegations from Wisconsin to the United States House of Representatives and the United States Senate.

The current dean of the Wisconsin delegation is Senator Tammy Baldwin (D), having served in Congress since 1999.

U.S. House of Representatives

Current members 
List of members, their terms in office, district boundaries, and the district political ratings according to the Cook Partisan Voting Index (CPVI). The delegation has a total of 8 members, including 6 Republicans and 2 Democrats.

Delegates from Wisconsin Territory

Members of the United States House of Representatives

1847–1849

1847–1863

1863–1873

1873–1883

1883–1893

1893–1903

1903–1933

1933–present

United States Senate

Key

See also

List of United States congressional districts
Wisconsin's congressional districts 
Political party strength in Wisconsin

References 

 
 
Wisconsin
Politics of Wisconsin
Congressional delegations